Manay Po 2: Overload is a 2008 film written by Dinno Erece and directed by Joel C. Lamangan and starring Rufa Mae Quinto, Cherry Pie Picache, and Polo Ravales in the sequel to Manay Po which was filmed under the working title Manay po 2: 3 Gays and a Baby.

Plot
Manay Po 2 continues the Manay Po story about a mother with 3 sons, 2 of whom are openly gay. The eldest son Oscar (Polo Ravales) is married to his business partner/boyfriend and the two are trying to have a son via artificial insemination and use of a surrogate mother. The woman named Bette (Rufa Mae Quinto) needs money and is willing to do anything for it, even being pregnant as a surrogate. Orwell (Jiro Manio), in his teens, is still confused about his sexuality and has a crush in school on his class's swimming instructor but cannot say it. Orson (John Prats), the only openly gay of the siblings, has become the campus queen, which angers Marky's girlfriend (EJ Jallorina).  Problems arise between Oscar and his boyfriend when Bette demands more time with her. Bette dirty secret is that she has a live-in partner, who is revealed to be the one who stole the jewelry in the preceding film. The man steals the baby from Bette and tries to ransom it, but a timely intervention from Orson's family and friends rescues the infant, revealed to be dark complected in contrast to the tone of the mother's paler flesh. Bette reveals that she was using a skin-whitening product and bids farewell to the family.

Main Cast

 Cherry Pie Picache as Luzvimida "Luz" Catacutan
 Polo Ravales as Oscar "Cherie Gil" Dimagiba
 John Prats as Orson "Ursula" Castello
 Jiro Manio as Orwell "Wella" Castello
 Sid Lucero as Adrian "Adriana" Pengson
Rufa Mae Quinto as Bette
 Christian Vasquez as Gerry
 Marco Alcaraz as Moxie
 Giselle Sanchez as Maritess
 Rubi Rubi as Summer Rain
 IC Mendoza as Frida
 EJ Jallorina as Daphne
 Alex Castro as Rainier
 Mike Tan as Marky
 Andrea Torres as Ida
 Madam Auring as Applicant
 Charles Christianson as Cher
 Paolo Rivero as Mr. Padilla
 Jim Pebanco as Rouel
 Anthony Roquel as Principal

Reception

References

External links
 Manay Po 2 at the Internet Movie Database

2008 films
2008 romantic comedy films
2008 LGBT-related films
Regal Entertainment films
Filipino-language films
2000s Tagalog-language films
Philippine romantic comedy films
LGBT-related romantic comedy films
Films directed by Joel Lamangan
2000s English-language films